Thorncliffe is a residential neighbourhood in the northwest quadrant of Calgary, Alberta. It is bounded by 64 Avenue to the north, Deerfoot Trail to the east, McKnight Boulevard to the south and 14 Street West and Nose Hill Park to the west.

Thorncliffe was established in 1954. It is represented in the Calgary City Council by the Ward 4 councillor.

Demographics

Residents in this community had a median household income of $50,009 in 2000, and there were 20.8% low income residents living in the neighbourhood. As of 2000, 18.8% of the residents were immigrants. A proportion of 13.8% of the buildings were condominiums or apartments, and 34% of the housing was used for renting.

Education
The community is served by Colonel Sanders Elementary and Thorncliffe Elementary public school, as well as by Corpus Christi Elementary School (Catholic).

See also
List of neighbourhoods in Calgary

References

External links
Greeview-Thorncliffe Community Association

Neighbourhoods in Calgary